Romancham is a 2023 Indian Malayalam-language comedy horror film written and directed by Jithu Madhavan in his directorial debut, starring Soubin Shahir, Arjun Ashokan, Sajin Gopu, Siju Sunny and Abin Bino in the lead roles.

Plot
Based on real incidents that happened in the life of seven bachelors in 2007 Bangalore after using a Ouija board and subsequent events, the film satirically explores how divination that started as fun becomes a problem bigger than boredom.

Cast

Production
The film is produced by John Paul George and Girish Gangadharan under the banner 'Guppy Cinemas'.

Music

Release

The film was released on 3 February 2023 across 144 theaters in Kerala.

Reception

Critical Response
The film received highly positive reviews from the critics. Gopika of Times of India  gave the film a rating of 4/5 and wrote "Romancham is the movie that gives us this wonderful formula. There is no exaggeration, no nonsensical humour, the movie is simply hilarious and interestingly, it's inspired from real life incidents.
S.R Praveen of The Hindu  wrote "Along with some top-notch comic performances from the entire cast, everything works like a charm and evokes uproarious laughter in director Jithu Madhavan’s debut film 

Cris of The News Minute  gave the film a rating of 4/5 and wrote "Along with some top-notch comic performances from the entire cast, everything works like a charm and evokes uproarious laughter in director Jithu Madhavan’s debut film 

Sajin Shirjith of The New Indian Express  wrote "Romancham is at its funniest when it explores the idiosyncrasies of its well-sketched character"

References

2020s Malayalam-language films
2023 horror films
2023 directorial debut films